Mohamad Zuraimi bin Razali is a Malaysian politician. He has been the Member of Perak State Legislative Assembly for Manong from 2018 to November 2022.

Politics 
He is the Deputy Chief of UMNO Kuala Kangsar Branch.

Election result

References 

Malaysian Muslims
United Malays National Organisation politicians
Members of the Perak State Legislative Assembly
Malaysian people of Malay descent
Living people
1972 births